RR Herrera is a Filipino actor, and was an award-winning child actor in the Philippines. He won the Metro Manila Film Festival Best Child Performer for Agila Ng Maynila (1988) and FAMAS Award Best Child Actor for the movie Rosenda (1989).

Career
Herrera began his acting career at the age of seven, appearing in the TV show Agila (1987). He later appeared in the films FPJ-starrers Hindi Ka Na Sisikatan ng Araw (1990) and Batas ng .45 (1991), among others.
 
He was one of the regular hosts of the variety show Eh Kasi Bata, along with Aiza Seguerra, L.A. Lopez and Kathleen Go Quieng.

Herrera guested in ABS-CBN's Kris TV (2011).

Personal life
Herrera received a bachelor's degree in Communications Technology from the Ateneo de Manila University. He is now regional director of TrainStation.

Herrera's life partner is Carelle Mangaliag, who was famous for her stint as one of the singers for the 1995 World Youth Day Philippines theme song, 'Tell the World of His Love'.

Herrera is a licensed SCUBA diver and hobbyist underwater photographer.

Awards and nominations
Herrera has won or been nominated for the following awards:

Filmography
Herrera has appeared in the following films and TV shows:
Bunsong Kerubin (1987)
1 + 1 = 12 + 1 (1987)
Agila (TV series; 1987-1992)
Stupid Cupid (1988)
Nasaan Ka Inay? (1988)
Ex-Army (1988)
One Day, Isang Araw (1988)
Sandakot Na Bala (1988)
Agila ng Maynila (1988)
Barbi: Maid In The Philippines (1989)
Orapronobis (1989)
Impaktita (1989)
Delima Gang (1989)
Rosenda (1989)
Wanted: Pamilya Banal (1989)
Isang Bala, Isang Buhay (1989)
Carnap King? (The Randy Padilla Story) (1989)
Biokids (1990)
Bala at Rosaryo (1990)
Hindi Ka Na Sisikatan ng Araw: Kapag Puno Na ang Salop Part III (1990)
Andrea, Paano Ba ang Maging Isang Ina? (1990)
Batas ng .45 (1991)
At Your Service - Child Stars Reunited (TV program; 2005)
Fidel (2009)
Panahon Na (2009)
Fling (2010)

References

External links

Living people
Ateneo de Manila University alumni
Filipino male child actors
Year of birth missing (living people)